John Fernandez (Tamil: ஜொஹ்ன் பெர்னாண்டஸ்) (born 9 December 1941) was the Member of the Parliament of Malaysia for the Seremban constituency in the state of Negeri Sembilan from 2008 to 2013. He was a member of the Democratic Action Party (DAP) in the formerly Pakatan Rakyat (PR) opposition coalition.

He was first elected to Parliament in the 2008 election winning the seat of Seremban from the governing Barisan Nasional (BN) coalition.

Ahead of the 2013 election, he quit the DAP, protesting the lack of Indians being fielded as party election candidates, and recontested Seremban as an independent candidate. He lost to the candidate of his former party, Loke Siew Fook, after obtaining only 221 votes out of the 87,632 total votes cast, losing his deposit.

Election results

References

Living people
Malaysian politicians of Indian descent
1941 births
People from Selangor
Former Democratic Action Party (Malaysia) politicians
Independent politicians in Malaysia
Members of the Dewan Rakyat